Sun Devils or Sun Devil may refer to:
Arizona State Sun Devils, nickname for the sports teams of Arizona State University.
Sun Devils (comics), a DC Comics maxi-series
Sun Devils Drum and Bugle Corps of Orlando, Florida.
Sun Devil Gym, arena in Tempe, Arizona, United States
Sun Devil Marching Band of Arizona State University.
Sun Devil Stadium, outdoor football stadium on the campus of Arizona State University in Tempe, Arizona, United States